Ieva Krusta (born 8 August 1976 as Ieva Pikšena) is a Latvian curler. She is currently the lead on the Latvian National Women's Curling Team.

Career
Krusta was the second for the Latvian team at the 2010 Ford World Women's Curling Championship in Swift Current, Canada. The team finished in last with a 1–10 record. She also represented Latvia at the 2013 World Women's Curling Championship at home in Riga, Latvia, finishing again in the last place with a 1–10 record. The team qualified for the 2019 World Women's Curling Championship after posting an impressive 4–5 record at the 2018 European Curling Championships which included defeating higher-ranked Scotland's Eve Muirhead. The team did not have the same success at the World's as they did at the Europeans, finishing once again in last with a 1–11 record.

She currently serves as one of the coaches of the Latvian junior women's team.

References

External links
 

Latvian female curlers
Living people
1976 births
Latvian curling coaches
21st-century Latvian women